Tranebergs Idrottsplats was a football stadium in Traneberg district, western Stockholm, Sweden. It was opened in September 1911. Tranebergs Idrottsplats served as the home ground of Djurgårdens IF for 25 seasons. The stadium was closed in September 1936, followed up by demolition.

1912 Summer Olympics
In 1912 Summer Olympics Tranebergs Idrottsplats hosted three football matches.

Matches

References

Venues of the 1912 Summer Olympics
Olympic football venues
Defunct football venues in Sweden
Football venues in Stockholm
1911 establishments in Sweden
Sports venues completed in 1911
Sports venues demolished in 1936
1936 disestablishments in Sweden